Clover Hollow Natural Area Preserve is a Natural Area Preserve located in Giles County, Virginia. The  preserve protects Stay High Cave, which houses seven rare cave-dwelling invertebrate species, three of which are only known from the county's Sinking Creek Valley. More common species, such as salamanders, crickets, harvestmen, spiders, crayfish, and bats, also live within the cave's streams, riparian mud banks, and drip pools. Most water in the cave stream comes from forested slopes.

The significance of the preserve was discovered in 1994, when speleologist Dave Hubbard inventoried the cave in response to local concerns. After both the Virginia Natural Heritage Program and the Cave Conservancy of the Virginias identified the cave as a conservation priority, the state took control of the site in 2005.

The preserve is owned and maintained by the Virginia Department of Conservation and Recreation. Access is strictly limited to activities related to data collection and monitoring.

See also
 List of Virginia Natural Area Preserves

References

External links
Virginia Department of Conservation and Recreation: Clover Hollow Natural Area Preserve

Caves of Virginia
Virginia Natural Area Preserves
Protected areas of Giles County, Virginia